Lomariocycas palmiformis, synonym Blechnum palmiforme, is a species of fern in the family Blechnaceae. It is endemic to the Tristan da Cunha group of islands. The species is a tree fern that can grow to 2 m in some sheltered areas. It resembles the form of a palm tree, but is not part of Arecaceae, the palm family.

References

Blechnaceae
Flora of Tristan da Cunha